McAdams Park, formerly McKinley Park, is a city park, baseball field, and swimming pool built in 1901 and located at 1329 E. 13th Street in Wichita, Kansas, United States

History 
The park was originally  and was named McKinley Park when it opened in 1901. Later parcels were added in 1941, 1946, and 1980. 

In 1966, the City of Wichita renamed McKinley Park to McAdams Park in honor of the late Emerson McAdams. McAdams, a former city policeman, served 27 years as director of McKinley Park. He died October 20, 1965, aged 52. Facilities at the park were enhanced in 1968 in conjunction with construction of the canal route. Land and Water Conservation Funds, provided by the Kansas Department of Wildlife, Parks and Tourism and the National Park Service, have been used to develop this park.

The city's first artificial turf baseball diamond was constructed in 2016, and a new restroom and concession stand was constructed in 2017.

In 2020, the McAdams Pool was renamed the McAfee Pool, named after Charles F. McAfee the Black architect who built the park pool in 1969.

References

Parks in Kansas
Wichita, Kansas
1901 establishments in Kansas